The 2019 OFC Futsal Nations Cup was the 12th edition of the OFC Futsal Nations Cup (previously called the OFC Futsal Championship), the international futsal championship organised by the Oceania Football Confederation (OFC) for the men's national teams of Oceania.

In November 2018, it was announced that New Caledonia would host the competition. The tournament was held from 27 October to 2 November.

The winner qualified as the OFC representative at the 2021 FIFA Futsal World Cup (originally 2020 but postponed due to COVID-19 pandemic) in Lithuania.

Solomon Islands were the defending champions, and successfully defended their title after defeating New Zealand in the final.

Teams
Eight of the 11 FIFA-affiliated national teams from OFC entered the tournament.

Did not enter

Venue
The matches were played at the L'Arène du Sud in Païta.

Squads

Draw
The draw of the tournament was held on 6 May 2019 at the OFC Academy in Auckland, New Zealand. The eight teams were drawn into two groups of four teams. The top two ranked teams, Solomon Islands and New Zealand, were drawn into position 1 of Group A or B, and the bottom two ranked teams, American Samoa and Tonga, were drawn into position 4 of Group A or B, while the remaining teams were drawn into position 2 or 3 of Group A or B.

Group stage
The top two teams of each group advance to the semi-finals. The bottom two teams enter the 5th–8th place play-offs.

All times are local, NCT (UTC+11).

Group A

Group B

5th–8th place play-offs
Tonga was not allowed to play the 5th-8th place play-offs because many players were diagnosed with measles.  It is important to remember that this tournament was held during a measles outbreak.

Bracket (5th–8th place)

Play-off semi-finals

Seventh place match

Fifth place match

Knockout stage

Bracket (1st–4th place)

Semi-finals

Third place match

Final
Winner qualifies for 2021 FIFA Futsal World Cup.

Qualified teams for FIFA Futsal World Cup
The following team from OFC qualified for the 2021 FIFA Futsal World Cup.

1 Bold indicates champions for that year. Italic indicates hosts for that year.

Awards
The following awards were given at the conclusion of the tournament.

References

External links
OFC Futsal Nations Cup 2019
News > OFC Futsal Nations Cup 2019 , oceaniafootball.com

2019
2021 FIFA Futsal World Cup qualification
2019 in futsal
Futsal Nations Cup
2019 OFC Futsal Nations Cup
2019 in New Caledonian football
October 2019 sports events in Oceania
November 2019 sports events in Oceania